Jai Singh Agrawal is the current member of Chhattisgarh Legislative Assembly for Korba (Assembly number-21). He is also the Minister for Revenue, Government of Chhattisgarh. He assumed office as M.L.A of Korba on 11 December 2008 - Incumbent, and as Minister on 26 December 2018 - Incumbent. He won three elections consecutively and became the first Minister from Korba District.

References

Living people
Chhattisgarh MLAs 2008–2013
Chhattisgarh MLAs 2013–2018
Chhattisgarh MLAs 2018–2023
1963 births